Edward Ebo Mends (born 12 February 2000 in Accra) is a Ghanaian professional footballer who plays as a midfielder.

Club career 
Mends started his professional career with the Liberty Professionals club of the Ghanaian Premier League from Ghanaian Division One side Hearts of Lion FC in January 2016. He signed a contract until December 2016. He moved on to Elmina Sharks in January 2017 until January 2019.
Currently, Mends plays in Ghana for Aquila Football Club.

Clubs
2013-2015 :Heart of Lions F.C. (first division football club Ghana)
2016-2017 :Liberty Professionals (Ghana)
2017-2019 :Elmina Sharks F.C. (Ghana)
2019-     :Aquila Football Club (Ghana)

Notes and references

Ghanaian footballers
Ghana Premier League players
Association football midfielders
2000 births
Living people
Liberty Professionals F.C. players
Elmina Sharks F.C. players